George Elsby (6 June 1902 – 20 June 1953) was an English cricketer.  Elsby was a right-handed batsman who bowled right-arm medium pace.  He was born in Tunstall, Staffordshire.

Elsby made a single first-class match for Wales against the Marylebone Cricket Club in 1927.  In this match, he scored 14 runs in Wales first-innings, before being dismissed by Alec Kennedy, while in their second-innings he was dismissed by the same bowling for 22 runs.  During the course of the match he bowled 11 wicket-less overs.

He died in Ipswich, Suffolk on 20 June 1953.

References

External links
George Elsby at ESPNcricinfo
George Elsby at CricketArchive

1902 births
1953 deaths
People from Tunstall, Staffordshire
English cricketers
Wales cricketers